Željko Petrović (born 13 November 1965) is a Montenegrin football coach and former player. As a player, he represented the FR Yugoslavia national team at the 1998 FIFA World Cup.

Club career

Budućnost
Petrović made his professional debut with Budućnost in 1986 under coach Milan Živadinović. In Petrović's second and third season at Budućnost under coach Stanko Poklepović, the team included the likes of Dejan Savićević, Branko Brnović, Anto Drobnjak, Predrag Mijatović and Niša Saveljić. During Petrović's time at Budućnost, the team finished in seventh place in the 1986–87 season, in ninth place in the 1987–88 season, fourteenth in the 1988–89 season, and tenth in the 1989–90 season.

Dinamo Zagreb
Petrović moved to Dinamo Zagreb in 1990, where he played as a right back. In June 1991, Dinamo changed their name to HAŠK Građanski. In HAŠK Građanski's short 1991–92 UEFA Cup campaign, Petrović scored all three of HAŠK Građanski's goals over two legs played against Trabzonspor. He scored two penalties in the first leg played on 17 September 1991, which HAŠK lost 3–2 to Trabzonspor. He scored another goal in the second leg played on 2 October 1991, which HAŠK tied 1–1. In spite of Petrović's goalscoring form, HAŠK were eliminated from the UEFA Cup losing to Trabzonspor on aggregate.

Sevilla
Petrović joined Sevilla in November 1991, with his transfer from HAŠK Građanski costing the Spanish team 500,000 DM. HAŠK Građanski had agreed on Petrović's transfer as part of a package with Davor Šuker, who joined Sevilla simultaneously. At the time, La Liga teams could field only up to four foreigners on the pitch, and Sevilla already had two foreign starters in Iván Zamorano and Pablo Bengoechea. With the addition of Šuker, Petrović was meant to be Sevilla's fourth foreign starter, although he initially enjoyed little playing time. Gradually, coach Víctor Espárrago began bringing him off the bench, and in a breakthrough performance, Petrović made an assist in Sevilla's 1–0 win against Real Murcia in the 1992 Copa del Rey Round of 16. On 22 March 1992, Petrović scored his only goal in a league match with Real Burgos, with Sevilla winning 3–2. However, after the departure of coach Espárrago, a markedly dry spell followed, especially when Sevilla signed Diego Maradona in the summer of 1992. Therefore, he was quick to sign for Dutch club FC Den Bosch that summer.

Den Bosch and Waalwijk
Petrović joined FC Den Bosch in 1992 while his father was living in nearby Heusden as a guest worker. This circumstance seemed to be a deciding factor in his move to Den Bosch, as it was widely regarded that he could have easily played for a more competitive team. Den Bosch director Chris van der Laar commented that Petrović was "too good for Den Bosch". In spite of Petrović's good reception, Den Bosch struggled in the 1992–93 season and ended up relegated back to the second tier at the end of the season. After a 5–0 loss against Feyenoord in May 1993, Den Bosch coach Hans van der Pluijm noted that "[Petrović] is playing three classes better than the rest of the team." He was eager to join RKC Waalwijk in 1994. It was at this club which he excelled as an attacking right-back, and he scored 13 goals in total of 2 seasons before joining Dutch giants PSV Eindhoven in 1996.

PSV
Petrović joined PSV Eindhoven in the summer of 1996. He was a regular starter during the 1996–97 season, when PSV won the Eredivisie that season under coach Dick Advocaat. In his second season at the club, however, he proved a difficult player to manage and he was also involved in a spat with team captain Arthur Numan. Towards the end of Petrović's time at PSV, coach Advocaat was critical of his smoking habits. In the fall of 1997, Petrović accepted a lucrative offer from the Urawa Red Diamonds, which estranged him from the rest of the club. He insisted that he did not wish to leave PSV, but that the offer could not be ignored since ten of his relatives were living off of his money in Yugoslavia. Petrović played a total of 35 games for PSV. He played his last game for PSV on 5 November 1997, in a Champions League match against Newcastle United at St James' Park.

Urawa Red Diamonds
In 1997, he moved to Japan to play for Urawa Red Diamonds before returning to RKC Waalwijk in 2000 where he finished his playing career.

International career
Petrović made his debut for the national team of Yugoslavia on 12 September 1990 in a match against Northern Ireland. Yugoslavia was subsequently banned from the Euro 1992, the 1994 FIFA World Cup, and the Euro 1996 due to FIFA suspending Yugoslavia following the international sanctions against Yugoslavia. Petrović would play for Yugoslavia again five years after his debut, for the qualification to the 1998 FIFA World Cup.

Death threat
Petrović was a regular of the Yugoslav national team throughout the 1998 FIFA World Cup qualification. On 28 October 1997, the night before the first leg of the qualifying play-off against Hungary, Petrović received a death threat by an anonymous phone caller. The caller gave Petrović twelve hours to leave Yugoslavia before being killed. In the time preceding the death threat, Petrović had been subject to a whispering campaign that suggested he once played for the Croatian national team during the breakup of Yugoslavia, before Croatia became an official FIFA member. Petrović strongly denied this, and teammate Savo Milošević accused some journalists of jeopardizing Petrović's life by spreading fake news about him. Petrović went on to play for Yugoslavia at the 1998 FIFA World Cup.

After the rumors were spread, Petrović took several opportunities to explain how the media identified him. When a Dutch journalist asked Petrović about his nationality considering the breakup of Yugoslavia, Petrović insisted on his identity as a Yugoslav. He explained himself with the following:

Managerial and coaching career
On 21 August 2006, Petrović was appointed as the new head coach of Portuguese team Boavista. In his first match as manager, Boavista won 3–0 against Benfica. However, he resigned in October 2006 after only a month and a half in charge. The following 2007–08 season Petrovic managed RKC Waalwijk to a second place in the Dutch 2nd division and failed to gain promotion to the Eredivisie. In the 2008–09 season he was Martin Jol's assistant at Hamburger SV.

On 28 July 2010, West Ham United confirmed Petrović as the assistant manager to manager Avram Grant. On 23 November 2010, West Ham parted company with Petrović after less than four months. Upon his departure he made controversial comments about the Premier League questioning its quality. In February 2010, Petrovic was named assistant to manager Guus Hiddink at Anzhi Makhachkala.

On 17 March 2015, Petrović was named the assistant to manager Dick Advocaat at Sunderland, but was sacked on 4 October later that year. He became assistant to manager Advocaat once more when he joined him at FC Utrecht in 2018.

Botev Plovdiv
In the beginning of June 2019, Botev Plovdiv introduced Petrović as the new head coach of the club. Following his recommendations the club signed Marko Pervan, Philippe van Arnhem and Rodney Klooster. After a long run of poor results, on 16 October, Petrović was sacked. Shortly after that van Arnhem and Klooster were also released. In 12 games under his guidance Botev Plovdiv won only twice, achieved three draws and lost seven matches, last four of which in a row. The next Botev Plovdiv coach achieved seven wins in a row with the same squad attributing to the competency of Petrović.

Inter Zaprešić
In the beginning of January 2020, Inter Zaprešić introduced Petrović as the new head coach. On 10 April 2020, following the COVID-19 pandemic, Petrović terminated the contract with the club.

He was appointed assistant to Advocaat again at Feyenoord in summer 2020.

Iraq
After the resignation of Dick Advocaat in November 2021 as manager of the Iraq national team, Petrović took over on a caretaker basis. He would coach Iraq at the 2021 FIFA Arab Cup and the final round of the World Cup. In the last seconds of his first match as coach against Oman, which ended in a 1–1 draw, Petrović entered the field to designate who would kick the penalty. He was sacked on 2 February 2022.

Career statistics

Club

International

Managerial

References

External links
 
 
 
 
 

1965 births
Living people
Footballers from Nikšić
Serbs of Montenegro
Association football fullbacks
Yugoslav footballers
Montenegrin footballers
Yugoslavia international footballers
Serbia and Montenegro footballers
Serbia and Montenegro international footballers
1998 FIFA World Cup players
FK Budućnost Podgorica players
GNK Dinamo Zagreb players
Sevilla FC players
FC Den Bosch players
RKC Waalwijk players
PSV Eindhoven players
Urawa Red Diamonds players
Yugoslav First League players
La Liga players
Eredivisie players
Eerste Divisie players
J1 League players
J2 League players
Yugoslav expatriate footballers
Expatriate footballers in Spain
Yugoslav expatriate sportspeople in Spain
Serbia and Montenegro expatriate footballers
Expatriate footballers in the Netherlands
Serbia and Montenegro expatriate sportspeople in the Netherlands
Expatriate footballers in Japan
Serbia and Montenegro expatriate sportspeople in Japan
Montenegrin football managers
Boavista F.C. managers
RKC Waalwijk managers
Urawa Red Diamonds managers
Al-Shaab CSC managers
ADO Den Haag managers
Botev Plovdiv managers
Badak Lampung F.C. managers
NK Inter Zaprešić managers
Iraq national football team managers
J1 League managers
Montenegrin expatriate football managers
Expatriate football managers in Portugal
Montenegrin expatriate sportspeople in Portugal
Expatriate football managers in the Netherlands
Montenegrin expatriate sportspeople in the Netherlands
Expatriate football managers in Japan
Montenegrin expatriate sportspeople in Japan
Expatriate football managers in Bulgaria
Montenegrin expatriate sportspeople in Bulgaria
Expatriate football managers in Indonesia
Montenegrin expatriate sportspeople in Indonesia
Expatriate football managers in Croatia
Montenegrin expatriate sportspeople in Croatia
West Ham United F.C. non-playing staff
Montenegrin expatriate sportspeople in Germany
Montenegrin expatriate sportspeople in England
Montenegrin expatriate sportspeople in Russia
Willem II (football club) managers